Richard Dior (April 9, 1947 – October 26, 1998) was an American sound engineer. He won an Oscar for Best Sound for the film Apollo 13. He worked on more than 80 films between 1970 and 1998. He died in Marlboro, New Jersey from heart failure.

Selected filmography
 Dirty Dancing (1987)
 The Accused (1988)
 Bob Roberts (1992)
 The Pelican Brief (1993)
 Dead Man Walking (1994)
 Apollo 13 (1995)
 Ransom (1996)
 Broadway Damage (1997)

References

External links
 

1947 births
1998 deaths
American audio engineers
Best Sound Mixing Academy Award winners
20th-century American engineers